The United States Constitution (Article 1, Section 5) gives the House of Representatives the power to expel any member by a two-thirds vote.  Expulsion of a Representative is rare: only five members of the House have been expelled in its history. Three of those five were expelled in 1861 for joining the Confederate States of America.

However, the House has other, less severe measures with which to discipline members. Censure and reprimand are procedures in which the House may vote to express formal disapproval of a member's conduct.  Only a simple majority vote is required.  Members who are censured must stand in the well of the House chamber to receive a reading of the censure resolution.  A reprimand was once considered synonymous with censure, but in 1976 the House defined a reprimand as a less severe punishment.  Members who are reprimanded are not required to stand in the well of the House and have the resolution read to them.

Representatives can also be censured by their state legislatures and state party.

Expelled representatives

Censured representatives

Reprimanded representatives

Excluded representatives-elect

See also
Censure in the United States
List of federal political scandals in the United States
List of federal political sex scandals in the United States

Federal politicians:
List of American federal politicians convicted of crimes
List of United States senators expelled or censured

State and local politics:
List of American state and local politicians convicted of crimes

References

Censured or reprimanded members of the United States House of Representatives
Expelled members of the United States House of Representatives
Expelled
Federal political sex scandals in the United States
Political scandals in the United States by state or territory